Fat Jazz, also referred to as Jackie McLean Plays Fat Jazz, is an album by American saxophonist Jackie McLean, which was recorded in late 1957 and released by the Jubilee label in 1959. It features McLean in a sextet with trumpeter  Webster Young (here on cornet), tuba player Ray Draper, pianist Gil Coggins, bassist George Tucker and drummer Larry Ritchie.

Track listing
 "Filidé" (Jackie McLean, Ray Draper) – 7:21
 "Millie's Pad" (Webster Young) – 8:32
 "Two Sons" (Draper) – 7:17
 "What Good Am I Without You?" (Don Rodney, Sammy Gallop) – 7:35
 "Tune Up" (Miles Davis) – 5:31

Personnel
Jackie McLean – alto saxophone
Webster Young – cornet
Ray Draper – tuba
Gil Coggins – piano
George Tucker – bass
Larry Ritchie – drums

References

1959 albums
Jubilee Records albums
Jackie McLean albums